Guadelupe "Lupita" Novelo Osuna (born 5 May 1967) is a former professional tennis player from Mexico.

Biography
Novelo comes from Ensenada in the Mexican state of Baja California, one of six children of Don Antonio and Ana María.

Moving to the United States, she attended the University of Southern California (USC) for four years on a scholarship, then in the early 1990s competed on the WTA Tour as well as in representative matches for Mexico.

She won three gold medals at the 1990 Central American and Caribbean Games and in the same year debuted for the Mexico Fed Cup team. Over three years she featured in a total of 14 Fed Cup ties. At the 1992 Summer Olympics in Barcelona she made it into the singles draw as a lucky loser, replacing Helen Kelesi who had become ill. She lost in the first round to number one seed Steffi Graf.

On the professional tour she was most successful in doubles, with a top ranking of 92 in the world. As a doubles player she featured in the main draw of all grand slam tournaments, with her best performance coming at the 1992 Wimbledon Championships, where she and Kristine Radford made the round of 16. She reached a career best singles ranking of 250 and had a win over Chanda Rubin at the 1992 European Open.

Following a period of time coaching in the United States, Novelo returned to her hometown of Ensenada, where she runs the family business, a hotel called Las Rosas Hotel & Spa.

ITF finals

Doubles (8–6)

References

External links
 
 
 

1967 births
Living people
Mexican female tennis players
People from Ensenada, Baja California
Sportspeople from Baja California
USC Trojans women's tennis players
Tennis players at the 1992 Summer Olympics
Olympic tennis players of Mexico
Competitors at the 1990 Central American and Caribbean Games
Central American and Caribbean Games gold medalists for Mexico
Central American and Caribbean Games medalists in tennis